5X or 5-X may refer to:

Codes
5X, IATA code for UPS Airlines
5X, the production code for the 1982 Doctor Who serial The Visitation

Electronics
Huawei Honor 5X, a mobile telephone
Nexus 5X, a mobile telephone

Mathematics
5x, or five times in multiplication

Vehicles

Aircraft
Dassault Falcon 5X, a business jet
Light Miniature Aircraft LM-5X, a full-sized replica of the Piper PA-18 Super Cub

Cars
Chery Tiggo 5X, a subcompact SUV built since 2017

See also
X5 (disambiguation)